Ceuthophilus gracilipes, the slender-legged camel cricket, is a species of camel cricket in the family Rhaphidophoridae. It is found in North America.

Subspecies
These two subspecies belong to the species Ceuthophilus gracilipes:
 Ceuthophilus gracilipes apalachicolae Hubbell, 1936
 Ceuthophilus gracilipes gracilipes (Haldeman, 1850)

References

gracilipes
Articles created by Qbugbot
Insects described in 1850